A Tied Test is a Test cricket match in which the side batting second is bowled out in the fourth innings, with scores level. This is a very rare result; only two ties have occurred in the 2,494 Tests played since 1877. The first was in 1960 and the second in 1986. On both occasions, the aggregate scores of both sides (teams) were equal at the conclusion of play and the side batting last had completed its final innings: 10 batsmen had been dismissed or, from the perspective of the side bowling, 10 wickets had been taken. In other words, after four completed innings, with each innings ending either by a declaration or 10 wickets having fallen, the runs for both teams were exactly the same.

In cricket, a tie is distinct from a draw, a much more common result in Tests, which occurs when play concludes without victory by either team (except where a Test has been formally abandoned).

Both tied Tests involved the Australia national cricket team. Both ended in the last possible over of play on the last day with a ball to spare, meaning that within the space of several minutes all four normal Test match results were possible: a win for the batting side, a win for the fielding side, a draw or a tie.  Bob Simpson is the only person to be involved in both tied tests – as a player for Australia in the first, and as the Australian team coach in the second.

First tied Test, 1960

The first tied Test was played between the West Indies and Australia. The match was played at the Brisbane Cricket Ground, known as "the Gabba", in Brisbane, Queensland, Australia, between 9 and 14 December 1960.

West Indies 1st innings 
After a disastrous start of 65–3, Garfield Sobers made a rapid 132 in 174 minutes. Alan Davidson took 5–135. West Indies were all out for 453 runs.

Australia 1st innings 
Norm O'Neill made 181 in 401 minutes.  Australia were all out for 505, a lead of 52.

West Indies 2nd innings 
Alan Davidson took 6–87 and West Indies made 284, setting Australia a target of 233 runs to win.

Australia 2nd innings 
Davidson and Australian captain Richie Benaud set an Australian 7th-wicket partnership record of 134 in matches against the West Indies.

Last over 
Wes Hall was bowling, with the clock showing 5:56 pm. Australia stood at 227–7, needing six runs to win from the 8-ball over (the standard for tests in Australia at the time) with three wickets in hand.

 1st ball: Wally Grout, facing, was hit on the thigh. Benaud called him through for a single to take strike.  Five runs were needed to win from seven balls.
 2nd ball: Benaud attempted a hook shot but was caught behind by wicket-keeper Gerry Alexander. The score was 228–8.
 3rd ball: The new batsman, Ian Meckiff, cut to mid-off. No run. Still five runs to win from five balls.
 4th ball: The ball flew down leg-side without making contact with Meckiff's bat. Grout called him through for a bye.  Alexander threw the ball to the bowler's end to try to run out Meckiff, but his throw missed and Meckiff made his ground. Four runs to win from four balls.
 5th ball: Grout fended a bouncer to square leg, where Rohan Kanhai was ready to take the catch. Hall also attempted to take the catch in his follow-through, resulting in a fielding mix-up which allowed Meckiff and Grout take a single and the catch was not taken.  Three runs to win from three balls.
 6th ball: Meckiff swung desperately and sent the ball towards the mid-wicket boundary. The batsmen ran two runs as Conrad Hunte scooped the ball up just inside the fence.  The batsmen attempted a third run for victory but Hunte's return was flat and true, straight into the gloves of Alexander, who whipped off the bails before Grout could get home. The teams were tied.  Australia were on 232–9, requiring one run to win with one wicket in hand and two balls remaining.
 7th ball: The new batsman, Lindsay Kline, pushed the ball to square leg and set off for a single. Joe Solomon scooped up the ball and, with one stump to aim for from 12 metres out, threw the ball in and hit the stumps, running Meckiff out by a few inches.

Australia were all out for 232 and the match ended in the first tie in 84 years of Test cricket.

Second tied Test, 1986

The second tied test was the first Test of a three Test series, played between Australia and India, at the M. A. Chidambaram Stadium, Chepauk, Madras, in India between 18 and 22 September 1986. The conditions were said to be extremely hot and humid.

Australia 1st innings 
Australia declared at 574 for 7 early on the third day.  Dean Jones made 210, which was then the highest score by an Australian side in a Test in India, having faced 330 balls and hit 27 fours and 2 sixes. He had to be treated in hospital after the completion of the innings for heat exhaustion. Australian coach Bob Simpson described it as "the greatest innings ever played for Australia". David Boon scored 122, and Australian captain, Allan Border, 106.

India 1st innings 
India lost 7 wickets for 270 runs by the end of the third day, and were all out for 397, avoiding the follow on by only 23 runs and trailing by 177.  Indian captain Kapil Dev made 119 and Greg Matthews took 5–103 wearing a sweater to prove his toughness.  Sunil Gavaskar became the first Test cricketer to make 100 consecutive Test appearances.

Australia 2nd innings 
Australia declared at 170 for 5, their overnight score at the end of the fourth day, setting India a target of 348 to win.

India 2nd innings 
Starting positively, India reached 204 for 2, when Gavaskar was third out for 90.  India reached 291 for 5 when Chandrakant Pandit was out.  A flurry of tail-end wickets fell to leave India on 344 for 9 by the last over.

Last over 
Greg Matthews was bowling to Ravi Shastri, with India's last man Maninder Singh at the bowler's end.  India needed four runs to win from the 6-ball over with only one wicket remaining.

 1st ball: To Shastri: no run.  Four runs required off five balls.
 2nd ball: Shastri took two runs, retaining the strike.  Two runs required off four balls.
 3rd ball: Shastri pushed the ball to square leg for a single.  The scores were tied, with one run required for victory, but the Indian 11th man was now on strike.
 4th ball: To Singh: no run.  One run required off two balls.
 5th ball: The ball hit Singh on his back leg and umpire Vikramraju called him out leg before wicket after a loud appeal.

India were all out for 347, Matthews having taken 5–146 (10–249 in the match) and Ray Bright 5–94, and the match was the second tie in Test cricket.  Dean Jones and Kapil Dev were joint Men of the Match.

Draws with scores level
In addition to the two tied Tests, there have been two Tests which ended when time expired with the scores level in the fourth innings, but with the batting side still having wickets in hand. This results in a drawn match and not a tie.
The first such Test was in 1996, between Zimbabwe and England at Bulawayo, when England, chasing 205 to win, finished on 204–6. With three runs required for victory off the final ball, Nick Knight ran two but was run out attempting the third.
 The second such Test was in 2011, between India and the West Indies at Mumbai, when India, chasing 243 to win, finished on 242–9. With two runs required off the final ball, Ravichandran Ashwin completed the first run and was run out attempting the second.

See also
List of tied first-class cricket matches
List of tied One Day Internationals
List of tied Twenty20 Internationals

References

Further reading

1960 in Australian cricket
1960 in West Indian cricket
1986 in Australian cricket
1986 in Indian cricket
Test cricket matches
History of Test cricket